Humphrey Kayange (born 20 July 1982) is a Kenyan former rugby union player and organic chemist. Kayange is known within the rugby sevens community, as he has produced some of the best performances for the Kenya national sevens side. He is a former captain of the team.  He is a member of the International Olympic Committee (IOC).

Career
Kayange played for the military team Ulinzi RFC in the Kenya Cup league. The team was later disbanded, and he moved to Mwamba RFC. He was part of the Kenyan squad at the 2009 Rugby World Cup Sevens, reaching the semifinals. He was nominated for IRB Sevens Player of the Year in 2009. Kayange has also played for the Kenya national rugby union team (15s), playing at the 2011 World Cup Qualifiers. He is the older brother of IRB Sevens World Series top try scorer Collins Injera who also plays for Mwamba RFC. Their younger brother Michael Agevi has also played rugby for the Sevens in the past.

In 2010 Kayange was awarded the presidential Order of Golden Warriors (OGW) alongside his brother Collins Injera, for their performance in the 2008/2009 IRB world series.

In 2012 Kayange moved to Bristol, U.K. to undertake research into tenellin biosynthesis with Professor Christine L. Willis at the University of Bristol.

Kayange announced his retirement in October 2016 from the Kenyan rugby sevens team at the age of 34.

Honors 
In 2021, World Rugby inducted Kayange into its World Rugby Hall of Fame, alongside Osea Kolinisau, Huriana Manuel, Cheryl McAfee, Will Carling and Jim Telfer.

References

External links 
 
 
 
 
 Rugby in Kenya

1982 births
Living people
Kenyan rugby union players
Rugby union centres
Male rugby sevens players
Sportspeople from Nairobi
Rugby sevens players at the 2016 Summer Olympics
Olympic rugby sevens players of Kenya
Kenya international rugby sevens players
International Olympic Committee members